The 1979 SMU Mustangs football team represented Southern Methodist University (SMU) as a member of the Southwest Conference (SWC) during the 1979 NCAA Division I-A football season. Led by fourth-year head coach Ron Meyer, the Mustangs compiled an overall record 5-6 with a mark of 3–5 in conference play, placing sixth in the SWC.

Schedule

Roster

Team players in the NFL

References

SMU
SMU Mustangs football seasons
SMU Mustangs football